In the run up to the 2011 Portuguese legislative election, various organisations carried out opinion polling to gauge voting intention in Portugal. Results of such polls are displayed in this article.

The date range for these opinion polls are from the previous legislative election, held on 27 September 2009, to the day the next election was held, on 5 June 2011.

Nationwide polling

Graphical summary

Polling
Poll results are listed in the table below in reverse chronological order, showing the most recent first. The highest percentage figure in each polling survey is displayed in bold, and the background shaded in the leading party's colour. In the instance that there is a tie, then no figure is shaded but both are displayed in bold. The lead column on the right shows the percentage-point difference between the two parties with the highest figures. Poll results use the date the survey's fieldwork was done, as opposed to the date of publication.

Leadership polls

Preferred Prime Minister
Poll results showing public opinion on who would make the best Prime Minister are shown in the table below in reverse chronological order, showing the most recent first.

Sócrates vs Passos Coelho

References

External links 
 Marktest Opinion Poll Tracker
 ERC - Official publication of polls

2011